James de Cobeham (also de Cobham) was an English medieval Canon law jurist and university chancellor.

James de Cobeham was a Professor of Canon law. He was elected as Chancellor of the University of Oxford between 1300 and 1302.

References

Year of birth unknown
Year of death unknown
Canon law jurists
14th-century English lawyers
Chancellors of the University of Oxford
13th-century English lawyers
English male writers